Florentin Cruceru (born 25 March 1981) is a Romanian former football midfielder who played in his career for teams such as: Sportul Studențesc, Argeș Pitești or Farul Constanța.

References
 
 

Living people
1981 births
People from Găești
Romanian footballers
Association football midfielders
Liga I players
Liga II players
FC Sportul Studențesc București players
FC Argeș Pitești players
FCV Farul Constanța players
ASC Daco-Getica București players